Deadman's Island is a small island in the estuary of the River Medway in Kent, United Kingdom close to where The Swale flows into the Medway. The island is crossed by several narrow tidal channels that mean that at high tide the island is separated into several smaller islands.

The island consists primarily of mudbanks and is uninhabited. Owned by Natural England, it is leased to two people, and is also a Site of Special Scientific Interest (SSSI) due to its importance as a nesting and breeding site for birds.

In 2016 the remains of more than 200 humans were found on the island. It is believed that the remains are those of men and boys who died of disease on board prison hulks, floating prisons that were moored in the area around 200 years ago. Originally buried in wooden coffins under  of mud, coastal erosion and rising sea levels has washed away the mud to expose the remains at times of low tide. The island is marked with wooden posts across it, though these are probably to help identify the island and prevent erosion and not grave markers as sometimes claimed.

See also
Burntwick Island

References

Islands of England
Borough of Swale